Galium asprellum, the rough bedstraw, is a plant species in the family Rubiaceae. It native to eastern Canada and northeastern United States, from North Carolina and Tennessee north to Minnesota, Ontario and Newfoundland. It is considered a noxious weed in New York, Pennsylvania and Vermont, and is abundantly common in the other New England states and in sections of the Great Lakes region. It is a perennial herb. Leaves are simple with three or more leaves per node. Flowers have four petals and are white in color.

References

External links
Minnesota Wildflowers

asprellum
Flora of Canada
Flora of the United States
Plants described in 1803